Deirdre Wolhuter is a South African actress. She is best known for her roles in the popular films Friend Request, Charlie Jade and Kalahari Harry.

Personal life
She was born in Canada as the daughter of an Afrikaans father and a Canadian mother. In 1989, she completed her diploma in speech and drama from the University of Cape Town and later graduated with a Bachelor of Arts degree from the same university.

She is married to fellow actor and writer Jonathan Pienaar.

Career
She has involved in several theater plays: Outpost, King Lear, Circles in a Forest, Macbeth, The Man with the Thirteen Children and The Tempest. In 2006, she received a Micheal Mac Liammoir award for her role in the play Happy Endings Are Extra. Apart from them, she acted in the films such as The Crane Man, How Expensive was the Sugar, Hollywood in My House, Jimmy in Pink, A Pawpaw for My Darling, The Red Phone, Borderline, Master Harold, Boys and Forever.

In the television, she played the role 'Franci Roos' in Fluiters, and as 'Elsabet Langhans' in Meeulanders. In 2016, she was invited to play the role 'Mariaan' in the series 7de Laan. Apart from them, she appeared in the television serials: Going Up and Going Up Again, Madam and Eve, Orion, Charlie Jade, Khululeka, Backstage, Egoli and League of Glory.

Apart from acting, she is also a newsreader and presenter at Good Hope FM and where she conducted many Afrikaans and English radio dramas and serials. During the work, she is also a prolific bilingual voice artist.

Filmography

References

External links
 
 7de Laan’s ‘Mariaan Welman’ opens up about abuse storyline amid GBV outcry
 7de Laan Behind The Scenes:Here Is What You Missed
 There must be skeletons in a closet like this! There's a brand new family coming to 7de Laan

Living people
South African television actresses
South African stage actresses
South African film actresses
Year of birth missing (living people)